The Toy Symphony (full title: Cassation in G major for toys, 2 oboes, 2 horns, strings and continuo) is a musical work dating from the 1760s with parts for toy instruments, including toy trumpet, ratchet, bird calls (cuckoo, nightingale and quail), Mark tree, triangle, drum and glockenspiel. It has three movements and typically takes around seven minutes to perform.

It was long reputed to be the work of Joseph Haydn, but later scholarship suggested that it was actually written by Leopold Mozart. Its authorship is still disputed, however, and other composers have been proposed as the symphony's true author, including Joseph Haydn's younger brother Michael Haydn, who purportedly contributed movements to the work. 

Recent research (published in 1996) on a newly found manuscript suggests the Austrian Benedictine monk  (1740–1794) to be the author.  If Angerer's manuscript (from 1765, entitled "Berchtolds-Gaden Musick") is the original, the Toy Symphony was originally written not in G but in C major. These findings, however, are disputed among scholars.  There is reason to believe that the true composer will likely never be known, in whole or in part, given its confused origins and the paucity of related manuscript sources.

Other Toy Symphonies
The cassation described above was one of a number of anonymous toy symphonies composed at Berchtesgaden near Salzburg, then a manufacturing centre for toy instruments. Some of the instruments used for these can be seen in the Museum Carolino Augusteum in Salzburg.

Other toy symphonies by named composers include:
 Felix Mendelssohn: Two Kindersymphonie (1827, 1828)
 Bernhard Romberg: Symphonie burlesque, 'Toy Symphony', op. 62 (first published 1852)
 Ignaz Lachner: Toy Symphony, op. 85 (circa 1850s)
 Carl Reinecke: Kinder-Symphonie, 'Toy Symphony', op.239 (1895).
 Malcolm Arnold: Toy Symphony, op. 62 (1957)
 Joseph Horovitz: Jubilee Toy Symphony (1977)
 Stephen Montague: A Toy Symphony, for six amateur performers and chamber orchestra (1999)
 Tod Machover: Toy Symphony (2002)

Malcolm Arnold's Toy Symphony was first performed at a Savoy Hotel fund raising dinner in London on 28 November 1957, with toy instruments played by a group of eminent composers, musicians and personalities, including Thomas Armstrong, Edric Cundell, Gerard Hoffnung, Eileen Joyce, Steuart Wilson and Leslie Woodgate.  Similarly, the Jubilee Toy Symphony by Joseph Horowitz was composed for the Silver Jubilee of Elizabeth II in 1977 and featured Dame Peggy Ashcroft, Richard Baker, Joseph Cooper, Humphrey Burton, James Blades, Fenella Fielding, Nigel Kennedy, Yehudi Menuhin, Steve Race and Malcolm Williamson, among others. Tod Machover's piece deploys custom musical toys as electronic controllers.

References 
Notes

Citations

External links
 

Compositions by Leopold Mozart
Classical-period symphonies
Children's music
Compositions in G major
Compositions with a spurious or doubtful attribution
Toy instruments and noisemakers